DeCosta is a surname. Notable people with the surname include:

Benjamin Franklin DeCosta (1831–1904), American clergyman and historical writer
Eric DeCosta (born 1971), American football player
Karence DeCosta (1991–2009), American Virgin Islands singer and beauty queen
Pam DeCosta (born 1964), American college basketball coach